Grobler is a surname. Notable people with the surname include:

Bradley Grobler (born 1988), South African footballer
Du Preez Grobler (born 1977), Namibian rugby union player
Gerbrandt Grobler (born 1992), South African rugby union player
Hanna Grobler (born 1981), Finnish high jumper
Jaco Grobler (born 1992), South African rugby union player
Johannes Hermanus Grobler (1813–1892), South African politician
John Grobler, Namibian journalist
Liza Grobler (born 1974), South African artist
Stephanus Grobler (born 1982), South African cricketer
Ursula Grobler (born 1980), South African rower

See also
S v Grobler